Battle Kitty is a series created by Matt Layzell,   Co-produced by Netflix Animation, Choice Provisions, Higher Ground Productions EBS and Laughing Wild, the series premiered on Netflix on April 19, 2022.

Synopsis 
Set in a futuristic-medieval world, Battle Kitty follows the adventures of an adorable yet feisty kitten named Kitty, using magical bows instead of swords or axes, who along with his  friend Orc, embarks on a quest to become a great champion, by training to become a warrior, defeating all the monsters on Battle Island, and collecting their coveted keys. The duo face many obstacles and naysayers on their path to championhood, only to discover a surprise waiting in store for them at the Ancient Ruins.

Episodes

Production 
The series was announced by Netflix in March 2019.

Release 
Battle Kitty was released worldwide on April 19, 2022, on Netflix.

Notes

References

External links

2022 American television series debuts
2020s American animated television series
2020s American comic science fiction television series
2020s American LGBT-related animated television series
LGBT-related animated series
Gay-related television shows
American children's animated action television series
American children's animated adventure television series
American children's animated comic science fiction television series
American computer-animated television series
Animated television series about cats
English-language Netflix original programming
Interactive television
Netflix children's programming
Television series by Netflix Animation
Unreal Engine
Anime-influenced Western animation